Cramel is an Israeli children and youth television series based on the successful book series Cramel by . The first season aired from January 2, 2022 to February 3, 2022 on the channel Kan Educational. The episodes reached 14 million views on YouTube until all content was made exclusive to the Kan Educational website. One of the show's cast members, Lir Issa (ליר עיסא), confirmed Cramel would return for a second season by revealing pictures from the new set on his Instagram account.

Plot 
Three orphaned brothers discover that they are the only heirs of a rich uncle, who bequeaths them individually a castle, a luxurious automotive factory and a mysterious cat named Cramel. When they arrive at the castle, they meet Sep, the caretaker of the castle.

Characters 
 Cramel (operated by Goni Paz, voiced by Amir Kariaf) – the cat that Robbie inherits. Cramel has the ability to speak, practice various forms of magic, imitate voices and turn stones into pure gold. Loves cheesecakes.
 Robbie (Robert) Jerome (Yonathan Bar Or) – the main protagonist, inherits Cramel the cat from his uncle Arthur Jerome.
 El-El (Elliot) Jerome (Omari Lex) – inherits Arthur Jerome's castle. Arrogant, looks after his hair at all costs and is in love with Helena. El-El has a talent for songwriting.
 Goal (Gabriel) Jerome (Lir Issa) – inherits Arthur Jerome's automotive factory, but is not very bright. Talented in knitting, nicknamed by the knitting teacher "an Elevation". Winner of the national knitting competition. In episode 8, Helena wears his ring. In episode 17, El-El reveals that Helena loves him.
 Helena Bloom (May Kurtz) – Mrs. Bloom's beautiful daughter and Jane's cousin, helps her mother obtain the castle, the factory and the cat before going astray. In love with El-El. In episode 16 she gets involved in a love triangle with El-El and Goal, and in episode 17 reveals to Goal that she loves El-El.
 Mila Smith (Efrat Boymwald) – the adoptive mother of El-El, Goal and Robbie, who later adopts Jane as well.
 Mrs. Mimi Bloom (Lyrit Balavan) – the castle's housekeeper. She has been prevented from being fired due to an event that occurred at the Purple Lake. She hates Cramel and tries to get ownership of the inheritance. She is ashamed of her first name and lies that her name is Alfonsina. At the end of the first season, she leaves the castle in exchange for the gold that Cramel conjured for her.
 Sep Graham (Yuval Segal) – Mila's childhood friend and love interest. He likes taking photos with his camera and performs maintenance work at the castle.
 Chang/John (Udi Gottschalk) – the castle cook, who pretends to be Chinese and makes Chinese food. His real name is John.
 Jane (Lian Ben Yishai) – a talkative girl who ran away from the Clara Hermanes orphanage. Mrs. Bloom's niece and Helena's cousin.
 Vish Smith (Nevo Kaminka) – Mila's genius nephew. Eats only pasta with salt.

Overview

Awards

References 

Cats in popular culture
Israeli teen drama television series
Television shows based on books
2020s Israeli television series debuts

External links